Peter Townsend may refer to:

 Peter Townsend, owner of the Sterling Iron Works, who forged the 186-ton Hudson River Chain in 1778
 Peter Townsend (golfer) (born 1946), British professional golfer
 Peter Townsend (sociologist) (1928–2009), British sociologist, professor at the London School of Economics
 Peter Townsend (cricketer) (1910–1995), English cricketer
 Peter Townsend (RAF officer) (1914–1995), Royal Air Force pilot, linked romantically with Princess Margaret
 Peter Townsend (1919–2006), former editor of Art Monthly Australasia
 Peter Townsend (drummer), American drummer

See also
 Pete Townshend (born 1945), British guitarist of the band the Who
 Peter Townsend Barlow (1857–1921), American jurist
 Peter Townend (disambiguation)